Mayona Gewog is a former a gewog (village block) of Samtse District, Bhutan. It was part of Dorokha Dungkhag (sub-district), together with Dorokha, Dungtoe, and Denchukha Gewogs.

References

Former gewogs of Bhutan
Samtse District